Kirchdorf am Inn is a municipality in the district of Rottal-Inn in Bavaria in Germany. It lies on the river Inn.

Sports
The town is home to the American football club Kirchdorf Wildcats who moved there from Simbach am Inn in 2003 and has played at 2. Bundesliga level, now the German Football League 2, for many seasons.

References

Rottal-Inn
Populated places on the Inn (river)